Halfbrick Studios Pty Ltd is an Australian video game developer based in Brisbane. The company primarily worked on licensed games until 2008. The company is best known for Fruit Ninja (2010), Jetpack Joyride (2011), and Dan the Man (2015). They create games for Windows, Xbox, PlayStation, Windows Phone, Android and iOS.

Outside of their Brisbane headquarters, Halfbrick also has offices in Sydney, Adelaide, Spain, Bulgaria, and Los Angeles. In March 2012, Halfbrick Studios acquired Onan Games for an undisclosed price to make use of their software Mandreel, which allows games to support iOS, Android, Adobe Flash and HTML5 development.

In 2017, Halfbrick Studios was inducted into the Queensland Business Leaders Hall of Fame. Halfbrick is one of Australia's fastest growing companies, and is among Australia's most notable cultural exports.

Fruit Ninja 
By 2012, Fruit Ninja was on one third of all iPhones in the United States. By 2015, the game had been downloaded over 1 billion times. In 2020, the company announced a "complete rebuild" of the game with a new engine and new graphics.

Games

See also 

 Fruit Ninja
 Jetpack Joyride

References

External links
 

Video game companies of Australia
Video game companies established in 2001
Video game development companies
Companies based in Brisbane
Australian companies established in 2001
Apple Design Awards recipients